Tourelle may refer to:

 Tourelle (architecture), a type of turret
 Tourelle, Quebec, a former municipality that is now part of Sainte-Anne-des-Monts, Quebec